Devotion (Chinese: 阿娣) is a Singaporean Chinese drama which was telecasted on Singapore's free-to-air channel, MediaCorp Channel 8. It stars Zoe Tay, Chen Hanwei, Zhou Ying, Cynthia Wang, Zhang Zhenhuan, Kate Pang & Adeline Lim as the casts of the series. It made its debut on 28 June 2011 and ended its run on 1 August 2011. This drama serial consists of 25 episodes, and was screened on every weekday night at 9.00 pm.

The storyline spans 40 years, and is also dubbed the mid-year blockbuster-cum-47th anniversary drama.

Cast

Trivia
This drama is one of three drama blockbusters in 2011, the other two being The Oath as well as A Song to Remember.
This drama marks Zoe Tay's return after The Ultimatum in 2009. 
The drama coincidentally stars all three of the Star Search 1988 contestants still in the entertainment industry: Zoe Tay, Chen Hanwei and Aileen Tan.
Dai Yang Tian was offered the role Fu Shuangjie, but he turned down the role. The role was played by Zhang Zhenhuan instead.
This drama marks Taiwan star Chloe Wang's first Singaporean drama.
This drama also marks Star Search 2010 artistes Adeline Lim, Jeffery Xu and Darryl Yong's first drama production.
Cynthia Wang's role Lin Shanshan's surname was originally named Zhang.
This drama encored from 13 June 2012 to 17 July 2012 at 5.30pm. Unriddle 2 was supposed to make a quick encore the weekday after The Oath's encore finale, which is on the timespan stated and also planned to end a week earlier, but the channel wanted to encore this drama due to strong rating symbol guide in Singapore media.

Accolades
Devotion won a string of nominations at the awards ceremony, including a record three for the Young Talent Award and two for the Best Newcomer Award.The other dramas are nominated for Best Theme songs are Secrets for Sale, A Song to Remember, Kampong Ties & The Oath.

See also
List of programmes broadcast by Mediacorp Channel 8
List of Devotion episodes

References

Singapore Chinese dramas
2011 Singaporean television series debuts
2011 Singaporean television series endings
Channel 8 (Singapore) original programming